Aquent is a staffing company specializing in placing temporary employees in marketing and creative industries. According to Staffing Industry Analysts, it is among the "largest marketing/creative staffing firms in the United States". Aquent also operates internationally with offices in Japan, Canada, Australia, France, UK, and the Netherlands.

History
Harvard College students John Chuang, Mia Wenjen and Steve Kapner in 1986 founded a typesetting business called Laser Designs from their Harvard dorm. The business grew and they added temporary staffing related to Mac training as an offering and called it MacTemps. MacTemps grew, adding non-Mac as well as permanent placements. With MacTemps no longer reflecting the business, they changed their name to Aquent, intended to mean "not a follower" in Latin.

The company has grown substantially and entered into new business areas through acquisitions.

The company saw a drop in revenue in 2001 in the aftermath of the dot-com bubble with revenue dropping in 2001 compared to 2000. To counter the drop off in business, Aquent purchased Renaissance Worldwide Inc., an IT consultancy and staffing firm, for $106 million. Aquent at that time had been known for offering staffing of print and web designers. The deal allowed Aquent to also offer back end support staffers, which was considered by the company to complement well as a package solution. The acquisition of Renaissance also included a municipal and state government IT consulting subsidiary, which as initially planned was sold months later in 2002 to EOne Global for $45 million.

In 2003 the company made a hostile takeover offer for Computer Horizons Corporation, a computer network services company with a staffing business segment. Aquent through its investment banker Robert W. Baird & Co. had initially approached Computer Horizon's management on April 3, 2003 with an invitation to have dinner, which was rejected by Bill Murphy, the President and CEO of Computer Horizons. Aquent then proceeded to launch a cash tender offer on April 14, 2003 that valued Computer Horizons at $154 million. This proposal was opposed by management and in May the offer was rejected.

Aquent acquired Corporate Project Resources Inc. (CPRi), a staffing agency for marketing jobs, in 2005 for $25 million and renamed it Aquent Marketing Staffing while keeping its operations in Chicago.

In 2006, Aquent acquired Seattle-based Sakson & Taylor, a content design and development consulting and staffing firm with a significant presence at Microsoft, along with offices in several cities. The Sakson & Taylor brand (with "an Aquent company" appended) was retained for some years, but is no longer used. The former Sakson & Taylor headquarters are now Aquent's Seattle offices.

In 2011, Aquent launched a new division, Vitamin T, which focuses on placing "digital creatives" with marketing departments and advertising agencies for contract assignments.

In 2012, Aquent launched Gymnasium offering free online courses for creative talent.

In 2018, Aquent acquired Dev6, a consulting company which provides training courses to application developers.

Aquent Studios 
In 2003, Aquent Studios was launched a marketing division within Aquent that provides companies with an on/off site studio, which produces creative and marketing content. Aquent Studios also operates internationally.

References

Human resource management consulting firms
Consulting firms established in 1986
Temporary employment agencies